Reinhardt Strydom (born 16 June 1977) is a South African-born Irish international cricketer. He is a left-handed batsman and a left-arm medium-fast bowler. He made his ODI debut for Ireland during their tour of Bangladesh in March 2008.

1977 births
Living people
Cricketers from Cape Town
Afrikaner people
South African people of Dutch descent
Irish people of Dutch descent
South African emigrants to Ireland
Ireland One Day International cricketers
Ireland Twenty20 International cricketers
Irish cricketers
South African cricketers